Satya Yuga ( Krita Yuga), in Hinduism, is the first and best of the four yugas (world ages) in a Yuga Cycle, preceded by Kali Yuga of the previous cycle and followed by Treta Yuga. Satya Yuga lasts for 1,728,000 years (4,800 divine years).

Satya Yuga is known as the age of truth, when humanity is governed by gods, and every manifestation or work is close to the purest ideal and humanity will allow intrinsic goodness to rule supreme. It is sometimes referred to as the "Golden Age". The god Dharma (depicted in the form of a bull), which symbolizes morality, stood on all four legs during this period. The legs of Dharma reduce by one in each yuga that follows.

Etymology

Satya Yuga means "the age of truth or sincerity", sometimes abbreviated as Sat Yuga or Satyuga.

Krita Yuga, a synonym for Satya Yuga, means "the accomplished or completed age" or "the age of righteous or action", a time when people perform pious (righteous) actions, and is sometimes referred to as the "Golden Age".

Krita Yuga is described in the Mahabharata, Manusmriti, Surya Siddhanta, Vishnu Smriti, and various Puranas.

Duration and structure

Hindu texts describe four yugas (world ages)⁠ in a Yuga Cycle, where, starting in order from the first age of Krita (Satya) Yuga, each yuga's length decreases by one-fourth (25%), giving proportions of 4:3:2:1. Each yuga is described as having a main period ( yuga proper) preceded by its  (dawn) and followed by its  (dusk)⁠, where each twilight (dawn/dusk) lasts for one-tenth (10%) of its main period. Lengths are given in divine years (years of the gods), each lasting for 360 solar (human) years.

Krita Yuga, the first age in a cycle, lasts for 1,728,000 years (4,800 divine years), where its main period lasts for 1,440,000 years (4,000 divine years) and its two twilights each lasts for 144,000 years (400 divine years). The current cycle's Krita Yuga has the following dates based on Kali Yuga, the fourth and present age, starting in 3102BCE:

Mahabharata, Book 12 (Shanti Parva), Ch. 231:

Manusmriti, Ch. 1:

Surya Siddhanta, Ch. 1:

Characteristics

Among the four eras, the Satya Yuga is the first and the most significant one. Knowledge, meditation, and penance hold special importance in this era.

The Mahabharata, a Hindu epic, describes Krita Yuga as such:

See also
 Hindu units of time
 Kalpa (day of Brahma)
 Manvantara (age of Manu)
 Pralaya (period of dissolution)
 Yuga Cycle (four yuga ages): Satya (Krita), Treta, Dvapara, and Kali
 Itihasa (Hindu Tradition)
 List of numbers in Hindu scriptures
 Vedic-Puranic chronology

Notes

References

Four Yugas
Eight Yugas